Eyre River may refer to:

 Eyre River, New Zealand
 Eyre River (Western Australia)
 Eyre (river), France

See also
 Eyre Creek (disambiguation)